National symbols of Ecuador are the representative symbols that are used by Ecuador to represent the nation, reflecting different aspects of the cultural life and history. The official symbols or emblems of Ecuador are established by law and part of the Political Constitution of Ecuador.

Official symbols
The official symbols of Ecuador are established by law.

Unofficial symbols

See also
 List of national animals
 List of national anthems
 List of national birds
 List of national flowers
 National colours

References

 
Ecuadorian culture